Eskilstuna City FK is a Swedish football club located in Eskilstuna. The club is playing in Division 2.

Background
The club, formed on 1 November 1907 as IK City, is playing in Division 2 Södra Svealand, the fourth highest Swedish league. IK City played one season in the highest league of Sweden, Allsvenskan, in 1925–26, finishing last. The club changed to its present name before the 2000 season. They play their home matches at the Tunavallen in Eskilstuna. City FK is currently the biggest football club in Eskilstuna. As well, the club played in Division 2 for 23 straight years — from 1988 until their promotion in 2011.

Since 2006, Eskilstuna Södra FF have had a cooperation agreement with Eskilstuna City FK, which has enabled young City players to be loaned in the middle of season to the lower division club.

In November 2007, the City FK reached an agreement, called Eskilstuna Elitfotboll, with local rivals IFK Eskilstuna. The agreement stipulates that the City shall constitute the city's top team with a view to progressing to the Allsvenskan while IFK will play a development role. The agreement covers a three-year period and it must then be re-negotiated and renewed every two years.

In terms of the respective clubs' playing history, the contractual implications may seem a little surprising given IFK’s stronger record. However, City now play in a higher division than IFK and are more solid financially. City promoted to Division 1 in 2011, after remaining in the Division 2 for 23 straight years, by winning their section.

Eskilstuna City FK are affiliated to the Södermanlands Fotbollförbund.

Season to season

IK City played in the following divisions:

In recent seasons Eskilstuna City FK have competed in the following divisions:

Attendances
In recent seasons Eskilstuna City FK have had the following average attendances:

Achievements
Allsvenskan:
Best placement (12th): 1925–26

External links
Eskilstuna City FK – official site

Footnotes

 
Football clubs in Södermanland County
Allsvenskan clubs
Sport in Eskilstuna
Association football clubs established in 1907
1907 establishments in Sweden